Eddie Lee Mason (born January 9, 1972) is a former American football linebacker in the National Football League for the New York Jets, the Jacksonville Jaguars, and the Washington Redskins.  He played college football at the University of North Carolina and was drafted in the sixth round of the 1995 NFL Draft.  In 2004, Mason opened a training facility and gym in Sterling, Virginia under the name Mase Training.

Eddie Mason is the author of "Training for the Tough Game of Life," a Christian devotional book which shares stories and lessons Eddie learned through football and life.

References 

1972 births
Living people
People from Siler City, North Carolina
American football linebackers
North Carolina Tar Heels football players
New York Jets players
Jacksonville Jaguars players
Washington Redskins players